McCook is a city in and the county seat of Red Willow County, Nebraska, United States.  The population was 7,446 at the 2020 census.

History
McCook was platted in 1882 when the Burlington and Missouri River Railroad was extended to that point. It was named in honor of Alexander McDowell McCook, a brigadier general in the Union Army during the American Civil War.

McCook is known as the capital of the Buffalo Commons. In the 1980’s when times were hard, academics proposed that they should depopulate the high plains and give it back to the buffalo, except people of the town did not agree and wanted to stay on the land that they loved. The people were resourceful and able to overcome the hardship/stay in their community. 

Nowadays, the Buffalo Commons is used as a metaphor for looking for a solution. A solution McCook has been trying to utilize is tourism and community growth.

Events 
Heritage Days is an annual event held the last full weekend in September. This event has been happening since 1971. It is the town’s largest celebration. This event includes the Heritage Day Parade, a road race, entertainment from the high schoolers, and vendors on the street.

Red Willow County Fair is a five day fair held in July. This is the fair for the whole county. It includes games, rides, concerts, tractor rides, a rodeo, and food from local families and businesses.

Crazy Days is an annual weekend event to celebrate the local businesses. It includes crazy days sales in the stores, costume contests, and a car show. On the Friday night of this weekend, the people of this small town bring out their old and fancy cars and cruise up and down the main street in town, West B St. and Norris Ave.

McCook hosts the Buffalo Commons Storytelling Festival each summer.

Geography
McCook is located at  (40.205228, −100.626174).

Climate
McCook's climate is formally classified as hot-summer humid continental. Due to the very hot and humid summers typical of the Midwest and the January daily mean averaging around  it has a little bit of influence of the subtropical climates to the south, although winter nights are way too severe for subtropical plants to thrive. Winters are generally cold and dry and summers hot and humid.

More typically, however, there is an average of 5.4 days annually with a maximum at or above , 45 days annually with a maximum at or above , 28 days annually where the maximum stays at or below freezing, and 8.6 days annually with a minimum at or below .

Demographics

2010 census
As of the census of 2010, there were 7,698 people, 3,324 households, and 2,021 families living in the city. The racial makeup of the city was 95.8% White, 0.5% African American, 0.5% Native American, 0.4% Asian, 1.5% from other races, and 1.3% from two or more races. Hispanic or Latino of any race were 4.9% of the population.

There were 3,324 households, of which 27.4% had children under the age of 18 living with them, 47.8% were married couples living together, 9.3% had a female householder with no husband present, 3.7% had a male householder with no wife present, and 39.2% were non-families. 33.9% of all households were made up of individuals, and 16.7% had someone living alone who was 65 years of age or older. The average household size was 2.25 and the average family size was 2.89.

The median age in the city was 40.7 years. 23% of residents were under the age of 18; 9.4% were between the ages of 18 and 24; 22% were from 25 to 44; 26.2% were from 45 to 64; and 19.5% were 65 years of age or older. The gender makeup of the city was 48.3% male and 51.7% female.

2000 census
As of the census of 2000, there were 7,994 people, 3,371 households, and 2,154 families living in the city. The population density was 1,485.1 people per square mile (573.7/km). There were 3,754 housing units at an average density of 697.4 per square mile (269.4/km). The racial makeup of the city was 97.37% White, 0.18% African American, 0.45% Native American, 0.18% Asian, 0.91% from other races, and 0.91% from two or more races. Hispanic or Latino of any race were 2.53% of the population. The population was 7,410 in 2009.

There were 3,371 households, out of which 29.1% had children under the age of 18 living with them, 52.7% were married couples living together, 8.2% had a female householder with no husband present, and 36.1% were non-families. 31.7% of all households were made up of individuals, and 15.2% had someone living alone who was 65 years of age or older. The average household size was 2.29 and the average family size was 2.90.

In the city, the population was spread out, with 24.1% under the age of 18, 9.7% from 18 to 24, 24.2% from 25 to 44, 21.3% from 45 to 64, and 20.7% who were 65 years of age or older. The median age was 40 years. For every 100 females, there were 89.2 males. For every 100 females age 18 and over, there were 86.3 males.

As of 2000 the median income for a household in the city was $31,105, and the median income for a family was $40,455. Males had a median income of $28,065 versus $18,516 for females. The per capita income for the city was $16,691. About 7.9% of families and 9.4% of the population were below the poverty line, including 9.7% of those under age 18 and 8.4% of those age 65 or over.

Culture
The Harvey P. Sutton House at 602 Norris Avenue was designed by influential architect Frank Lloyd Wright in 1905–1907 and built 1907–1908.  The classic Prairie-style house is listed in the National Register of Historic Places; it is the only Wright house known to have been built in Nebraska.  The house is used as a private residence, and is not open to the public.

McCook Army Airfield, active from 1943 through 1945, was located nine miles northwest of McCook.

McCook hosted a professional baseball team, the McCook Braves, who played in the Nebraska State League from 1956 to 1959. In their final season in 1959, the club featured future Baseball Hall of Famer Phil Niekro and won the NSL championship; both the Braves and the league folded at season's end. Another pitcher on the team, Pat Jordan, later became a writer for the Sporting News, and wrote an autobiography dealing with his career with the Braves, A False Spring.

McCook is home to the first two-year junior college in Nebraska. McCook Junior College was founded in September 1926 on the second floor of the YMCA building on Main Street.  The name was eventually changed to McCook Community College and was governed over the Mid-Plains Area.

The McCook Economic Development Corporation works “To facilitate the formation, retention, attraction, and expansion of businesses in McCook and the surrounding area.”

Parks and recreation
McCook is home to Heritage Hills Golf Course.  The 18-hole par-72 championship golf course was designed by Bradford Benz, ASGCA, and Richard M. Phelps, ASGCA, and opened in 1981.  The links style course plays over 7,100 yards from the back tees.  Heritage Hills was included in Golf Digest's Best 75 Golf Course's in 1984 and Golf Digest's Top 100 Toughest Public Course's in 1986.  Heritage Hills underwent a major renovation for upgrades and modernization in 2013.

Government
McCook has a council-manager style government.  Five council members are elected at large; the five elect one of their number as mayor, and a second as vice president.  As of 2015, council members are Mayor Mike Gonzales, Vice-President Janet Hepp, Jerry Calvin, Bruce McDowell, and Gene Weedin.

The city government operates through eight departments and offices: Administration, Building and Zoning, Fire, Library, Police, Public Works, Senior Center, and Utilities.  Advisory boards and commissions, both those required by law and those created for specific purposes, are appointed by the council; as of 2015, there were fourteen such boards and commissions.

Transportation

Rail
Amtrak, the national passenger rail system, provides service through McCook, operating its California Zephyr daily in both directions between Chicago and Emeryville (Oakland), California, with stops in Omaha, Lincoln, and Hastings.

Air
Commuter airline Denver Air Connection is currently serving the McCook Regional Airport with daily nonstop round trip commercial flights to Denver, Colorado.

Media

Newspapers
The McCook Daily Gazette is the city's newspaper, published five days a week.  In 1929, the newspaper became one of the first in the world to be delivered regularly by air: for several months its airplane, named the Newsboy, flew a daily route, dropping bundles of newspapers to carriers in outlying towns.

Radio

Notable people
George W. Norris, who held seats in the U.S. House of Representatives and Senate from 1903 to 1943, was a resident of McCook.  Norris was the driving force behind the conversion of Nebraska's legislature to a unicameral system; in the Senate, he was a leading figure behind the creation of the Tennessee Valley Authority.  His house in McCook is operated as a museum by the Nebraska State Historical Society, and is listed in the National Register of Historic Places.  Originally named Main, the principal north–south thoroughfare through central McCook was renamed Norris Avenue in his honor.

Three governors of Nebraska made their homes in McCook: Ralph G. Brooks, Frank Morrison, and Ben Nelson, who represented Nebraska in the U.S. Senate for two terms, from 2000 to 2012. Frank B. Morrison Jr., Montana Supreme Court justice and son of Frank Morrison, was born in McCook.

John R. McCarl, the first Comptroller General of the United States, was raised in McCook. He is also buried there.

Former professional football player Jeff Kinney is a 1968 graduate of McCook High School.

TV evangelist Bob Larson was raised in McCook.

See also
 National Register of Historic Places listings in Red Willow County, Nebraska

References

External links
 
 City of McCook
 Visit McCook, Tourist Site
 McCook Daily Gazette, Newspaper

Cities in Nebraska
Cities in Red Willow County, Nebraska
County seats in Nebraska
Populated places established in 1882
1882 establishments in Nebraska